This is a summary of 1914 in music in the United Kingdom.

Events
February – Regal Recordings issues its first records.
27 February – George Butterworth's The Banks of Green Willow is premièred at West Kirby, Liverpool, conducted by Adrian Boult.  
16 March – A new concert hall, the Usher Hall, opens in Edinburgh.
26 August – Rutland Boughton's "fairy opera" The Immortal Hour is premièred at Glastonbury Assembly Rooms as part of the inaugural Glastonbury Festival, co-founded de by Boughton himself.
24 October – Adelina Patti gives her final public performance, in a Red Cross concert for the benefit of First World War veterans, at London's Royal Albert Hall.

Popular music
Paul Rubens – "Your King and Country Want You"

Classical music: new works
Kenneth J. Alford – Colonel Bogey March
Granville Bantock – The Song of Liberty
Frederick Delius – Violin Sonata No. 1
Edward Elgar – "The Shower" and "The Fountain", SATB unacc., words by Henry Vaughan, Op. 71 Nos.1 and 2
Herbert Howells – Piano Concerto No. 1
Roger Quilter – A Children's Overture
Ralph Vaughan Williams
The Lark Ascending (original version completed)
Symphony No. 2, A London Symphony

Opera
Rutland Boughton – The Immortal Hour (see Events)

Musical theatre
4 November – Revival of The Earl and the Girl by Seymour Hicks, with lyrics by Percy Greenbank and music by Ivan Caryll, at the Aldwych Theatre.

Births
11 March – William Lloyd Webber, organist and composer (died 1982)
24 May – Harry Parr Davies, composer and songwriter (died 1955)
23 August – Harold Truscott, composer, pianist, broadcaster and writer on music (died 1992)
14 December – Rosalyn Tureck, pianist (died 2003)

Deaths
7 January – Patrick Weston Joyce, historian and musicologist, 86
23 July – Harry Evans, conductor and composer, 41
13 September – Robert Hope-Jones, inventor of the theatre organ, 55 (suicide)

See also
 1914 in the United Kingdom

References

British Music, 1914 in
Music
British music by year
1910s in British music